Jonathan Edmund Fulford "John" Turner (9 November 1951 – 16 June 2020), better known by his stage name John Benfield, was a British character actor.

Early life and education
Benfield was born at Wanstead, Essex, son of margarine sales representative Fred Turner and his wife Joan, née White. He was educated at Loughton school, then the town's further education college; after four years as an ambulance driver in London, he studied history at the University of Nottingham, during which time he discovered a passion for acting with the drama society. After training at the Webber Douglas Academy of Dramatic Art from 1976 to 1978, with there already being an actor called "John Turner", he assumed the stage name "John Benfield", the surname coming from his mother's side.

Career
Benfield appeared in 75 television episodes or films starting in 1981 with small parts in BBC drama adaptations, such as The Winter's Tale and The Day of the Triffids.

Personal life
Benfield lived in Oxfordshire with his wife, Lilian, née Lees. They had one son, Freddie.

He died of sarcoma in June 2020 at the age of 68.

Filmography

Film
Breakout (1984) as Minder
Whoops Apocalypse (1986) as Secret Service Agent
Buster (1988) as Jimmy
Hidden Agenda (1990) as Maxwell
In the Name of the Father (1993) as Chief Prison Officer Barker
Beautiful Thing (1996) as Rodney Barr
101 Dalmatians (1996) as Doorman
Owd Bob (1998) as Blake
Cousin Bette (1998) as Dr. Bianchon
You're Dead (1999) as Badger
24 Hours in London (2000) as Insp. Duggan
Lover's Prayer (2001) as Nirmansky
Endgame (2001) as Dunston
Den tredje vågen (2003) as Stevens
Evilenko (2004)
Flood (2007) as Frank
Cassandra's Dream (2007) as Brian Blaine
Speed Racer (2008) as Cruncher Block
The Best Offer (2013) as Barman
Cold Skin (2017) as Captain Axel
Mowgli: Legend of the Jungle (2018) as Wolf Elder (voice)
The Coldest Game (2019) as Dr. Peter (final film role)

TV
Eurocops (1988-1990) as DC George Jackson
Treasure Island (1990 TV Movie) as Black Dog
Prime Suspect (1991-1995) as Superintendent Michael Kernan
Maigret (1993) as Henri Lautier
Sharpe's Revenge (1997) as General Calvet
Hippies (1999)
The Worst Week of My Life (2004) as Ron Steel

Other
Doctor Who: Circular Time (Audio Drama)

References

External links

1951 births
2020 deaths
British male film actors
British male television actors